Joy Bang (born June 15, 1945 as Joy Wener) is a former American actress best known for her film appearances in the early 1970s.

Early life
Bang was born in Kansas City, Missouri, and was adopted at one month old. She was raised in New York City, where she attended Hunter Elementary School. She attended Boston University for one year, but dropped out, and later worked as a go-go dancer. She married Paul Bang in the late 1960s.

Career
Bang began her career collaborating with underground filmmaker Andrew Meyer in Boston. She would appear in a total of eight films between 1970 and 1973, most notably Woody Allen's Play It Again, Sam in 1972.

Bang also appears in a 1971 episode of the Christian TV series Insight entitled "The Party" and on the American television series Room 222 in the 16th episode of the third season, entitled "Where Is It Written?".

Selected filmography

References

External links

1945 births
Living people
Actresses from Kansas City, Missouri
Actresses from New York City
Boston University alumni
21st-century American women